Reenactment or re-enactment may refer to:

Legislation
 Consolidation bill, a bill that consolidates several Acts of Parliament into a single Act in the United Kingdom
 Repeal with reenactment, where a law is replaced with one more suitable

Other uses
 Docudrama, genre of radio and television programming, feature film, and staged theatre
 Historical reenactment, educational or entertainment activity
 Pastiche, a work of art that imitates the style or character of another artist
 The Reenactment, 1968 Romanian film based on a novel by Horia Pătraşcu

See also
 Adaptation (arts), a transfer of a work of art from one medium to another
 Dramatization (disambiguation)
 Enactment (disambiguation)
 Remake, a film or television series that is based on an earlier work
 Simulation, the imitation of a real-world process or system